Martinaire Aviation, L.L.C. is an American cargo airline based on the grounds of Addison Airport in Addison, Texas, USA, near Dallas. It operates feeder flights for overnight package delivery services, most notably on behalf of UPS. It is owned by Xwing.

History 

The airline was established and started operations in 1978 and acquired the freight operations of CCAir on 2 January 1990. It was in turn bought by a group of investors led by The Acker Group in December 1993. In 2005, Martinaire acquired fellow package carrier Mid Atlantic Aviation. In 2006, Martinaire acquired Superior Aviation of Lansing, Michigan. In 2011 Martinaire began acquiring Beechcraft 1900 aircraft to replace the Fairchild Metroliner, a move completed by mid-2012. The Beech 1900 aircraft were later removed and sold to Alpine Air.
As of January 2013, Martinaire is the second-largest single feeder carrier in the country.

The company was acquired by autonomous aircraft company Xwing in 2022.

Fleet 

The Martinaire fleet consists of the following aircraft (as of April 2009):

29 Cessna 208B Super Cargomaster

References

External links 
Martinaire

Cargo airlines of the United States
Airlines established in 1978
Airlines based in Texas
1978 establishments in the United States